Malinský is a surname. Notable people with the surname include:

 Josef Malínský (born 1953), Czech biathlete
 Ondřej Malinský (born 1983), Czech ice hockey defenceman
 Tomáš Malinský (born 1991), Czech football player

See also
 Malinska

Czech-language surnames